154CM is a type of stainless steel developed and manufactured in the United States by Crucible Materials Corporation (now - Crucible Industries). Crucible 154CM is a modification of martensitic stainless steel type 440C to which molybdenum has been added. It was originally developed for tough industrial applications and combines three principal elements: carbon, chromium, and molybdenum.
Hitachi Corporation of Japan copied the properties of this steel for their own brand known as ATS-34.

Typical applications
 Cutlery
 Bearings
 Valve Ports
 Bushings

Composition
154CM contains the following:
 Carbon 1.05%  
 Chromium 14.00%  
 Manganese 0.50%  
 Molybdenum 4.00%   
 Silicon 0.30%
 Iron 80.15%

References

External links 
 Benchmade Blade Steels
 Is 154CM Steel Good for Knives?

Steels